Various commemorative coins denominated in Irish currency were issued until 2002, when the Irish pound (IEP/IR£) came to an end and was superseded by the euro. Since then there have been Irish commemorative coins denominated in euro.

Irish pound

Silver ten-shilling piece (1966)

Dublin Millennium 50p (1988)

UN anniversary pound coin (1995)

Millennium pound coin (2000)

European Currency Unit (ECU)

See also

Euro gold and silver commemorative coins (Ireland)

References

 
 

Commemorative coins
Ireland
Ireland-related lists